The term monad is used in some cosmic philosophy and cosmogony to refer to a most basic or original substance. As originally conceived by the Pythagoreans, the Monad is the Supreme Being, divinity or the totality of all things. According to some philosophers of the early modern period, most notably Gottfried Wilhelm Leibniz, there are infinite monads, which are the basic and immaterial elementary particles, or simplest units, that make up the universe.

Historical background
According to Hippolytus, the worldview was inspired by the Pythagoreans, who called the first thing that came into existence the "monad", which begat (bore) the dyad (from the Greek word for two), which begat the numbers, which begat the point, begetting lines or finiteness, etc. It meant divinity, the first being, or the totality of all beings, referring in cosmogony (creation theories) variously to source acting alone and/or an indivisible origin and equivalent comparators.

Pythagorean and Neoplatonic philosophers like Plotinus and Porphyry condemned Gnosticism (see Neoplatonism and Gnosticism) for its treatment of the monad.

In his Latin treaty , Alan of Lille affirms "God is an intelligible sphere, whose center is everywhere and whose circumference is nowhere." The French philosopher Rabelais ascribed this proposition to Hermes Trismegistus.

The symbolism is a free exegesis related to the Christian Trinity. Alan of Lille mentions the Trismegistus' Book of the Twenty-Four Philosophers where it says a Monad can uniquely beget another Monad in which more followers of this religion saw the come to being of God the Son from God the Father, both by way of generation or by way of creation. This statement is also shared by the pagan author of the Asclepius which sometimes has been identified with Trismegistus. 

The Book of the Twenty-Four Philosophers completes the scheme adding that the ardor of the second Monad to the first Monad would be the Holy Ghost. It closes a physical circle in a logical triangle (with a retroaction).

The Euclidean symbolism of the centered sphere also concerns the secular debate on the existence of a center of the universe.

The idea of the monad is also reflected in the demiurge, or the belief of one supreme being that brought about the creation of the universe.

Pythagorean concept
For the Pythagoreans, the generation of number series was related to objects of geometry as well as cosmogony. According to Diogenes Laërtius, from the monad evolved the dyad; from it numbers; from numbers, points; then lines, two-dimensional entities, three-dimensional entities, bodies, culminating in the four elements earth, water, fire and air, from which the rest of our world is built up.

Modern philosophy
The term monad was adopted from Greek philosophy by modern philosophers Giordano Bruno, Anne Conway, Gottfried Wilhelm Leibniz (Monadology), John Dee, and others. The concept of the monad as a universal substance is also used by Theosophists as a synonym for the Sanskrit term "svabhavat"; the Mahatma Letters make frequent use of the term.

See also
 Dyad, Triad, and Tetrad  
 Ensō
 Henology
 Iamblichus Chalcidensis
 Ik Onkar
 Leucippus
 Monad (Gnosticism)
 Monadology
 Monism
 Om
 Taijitu
 Wahdatul Wajud
 Dr. Manhattan
 Theosophy

Notes

References

Bibliography
Hemenway, Priya. Divine Proportion: Phi In Art, Nature, and Science. Sterling Publishing Company Inc., 2005, p. 56. 
Sandywell, Barry. Presocratic Reflexivity: The Construction of Philosophical Discourse C. 600-450 BC. Routledge, 1996.

Concepts in ancient Greek metaphysics
Concepts in metaphysics
History of philosophy
Ontology
Neoplatonism
Pythagorean philosophy
Pythagoreanism
Theories in ancient Greek philosophy
1 (number)